This is a list of aircraft operators which are licensed by the Federal Air Transport Agency.

Passenger and cargo airlines

Major
This is a list of the major airlines in Russia.

Minor

Low-cost airlines

Air charter

Cargo

Other
Commercial air transportation of passengers and cargo:

Government airlines

Aerial work 
Aerial work (not licensed for commercial transportation of passengers and cargo):

See also
 List of defunct airlines of Russia
 List of small airlines and helicopter airlines of Russia
 List of VIP airlines of Russia
 List of airports in Russia
 Babyflot

References

External links
 Airports and Airlines of CIS

 
Russia
Airlines
Airlines
Russia
Russia